Carib Aviation was an airline based in Antigua and Barbuda.

History 

Founded in 1972 by (Sir) Frank Delisle with a single twin-prop aircraft, Carib Aviation provided charter and scheduled flights throughout the Caribbean from its main base in Antigua. At its peak the company employed 63 personnel, including some 15 pilots and 22 engineering staff. The office facilities were at VC Bird International Airport, accommodating administration, accounts, operations and traffic departments. An additional terminal office facility was located at Robert L. Bradshaw International Airport in Saint Kitts and Nevis. Carib Aviation also operated the DOMINICA AIR TAXI service between Antigua, Saint Lucia and Canefield Airport as well as a local feeder for LIAT.

On Tuesday 30 September 2008, Bruce Kaufman, new owner and CEO of the airline, announced that he was forced to cancel all flights the very same day because of no flight crews available. He accused LIAT of hiring seven of his Twin Otter pilots within a few days, breaking an agreement between the two airlines signed earlier in 2008 and leaving him with no choice but to stop all operations.

Destinations 
Anguilla
The Valley (Anguilla Wallblake Airport)
Antigua
St. John's (VC Bird International Airport)
Barbuda
Codrington (Codrington Airport)
Dominica
Marigot (Melville Hall Airport)
Roseau (Canefield Airport)
Guadalupe
Pointe-à-Pitre (Pointe-à-Pitre International Airport)
Martinique
Fort-de-France (Martinique Aimé Césaire International Airport)
Montserrat
Brades (Gerald's Airport)
Nevis
Charlestown (Vance W. Amory International Airport)
St. Kitts
Basseterre (Robert L. Bradshaw International Airport)
St. Lucia
Castries (George F. L. Charles Airport)
Vieux Fort Quarter (Hewanorra International Airport)
St. Vincent
Kingstown (E.T. Joshua Airport)
Tortola
Beef Island (Terrance B. Lettsome International Airport)

Fleet 

As of September 2008 the Carib Aviation fleet included :

1 Beech 65 QueenAir Excalibur
1 Britten Norman Islander

References

External links 
 Carib Aviation

Defunct airlines of Antigua and Barbuda
Airlines disestablished in 2008